Dunloy railway station served the village of Dunloy in County Antrim, Northern Ireland.

History

The station was opened by the Ballymena, Ballymoney, Coleraine and Portrush Junction Railway on 1 July 1856. It was taken over by the Northern Counties Committee in January 1861.

The signal box at Dunloy was destroyed in 1921 and again in 1957 during periods of civil disturbance.

The station closed to passengers on 17 October 1976

There have been calls to reopen the station at Dunloy.

References 

Disused railway stations in County Antrim
Railway stations opened in 1855
Railway stations closed in 1976
1855 establishments in Ireland
Railway stations in Northern Ireland opened in the 19th century